Purushottam Paudel, a member of Communist Party of Nepal (Unified Marxist-Leninist), assumed the post of the Minister of Youth and Sports of Nepal on 25 February 2014 under Sushil Koirala-led government.

He is also a member of the 2nd Nepalese Constituent Assembly. He won the Bara–6 seat in 2013 Nepalese Constituent Assembly election from the Communist Party of Nepal (Unified Marxist–Leninist).
He was very active leader since from his childhood during while he used to study in gaurishankar school nijgadh bara .

References

https://nijgadh.com/archives/4086

Communist Party of Nepal (Unified Marxist–Leninist) politicians
Living people
Year of birth missing (living people)
Government ministers of Nepal
Nepal MPs 1994–1999
People from Bara District
Members of the 2nd Nepalese Constituent Assembly